Greg Gerard Guidry (born July 1960) is a United States district judge of the United States District Court for the Eastern District of Louisiana. He is a former associate justice of the Louisiana Supreme Court.

Education 

Guidry is a 1985 graduate of the Louisiana State University Law Center in Baton Rouge, at which he was inducted into the Order of the Coif and was selected for The Louisiana Law Review. In 2010, he earned a Master of Judicial Studies from the National Judicial College. He was also awarded a Rotary International Foundation Scholarship for International Understanding. During the scholarship year, Guidry studied classical civilizations and Roman law at the University of the Witwatersrand in Johannesburg, South Africa.

State court service 

Guidry was formerly a judge on the Louisiana Court of Appeal for the Fifth Circuit, to which he was elected in August 2006. Earlier, Guidry served for six years as a judge of the Louisiana 24th Judicial District Court for Jefferson Parish in suburban New Orleans, Louisiana.

Louisiana Supreme Court 

Guidry was elected to the high court on November 4, 2008, with 160,893 votes (60 percent); his opponent, fellow Republican Judge Jimmy Kuhn, received 108,541 votes (40 percent). His service on the Supreme Court terminated once he received his federal judicial commission.

Federal judicial service 

In June 2018, Guidry was considered a contender for a vacancy on the U.S. District Court for the Eastern District of Louisiana. On January 16, 2019, President Donald Trump announced his intent to nominate Guidry to serve as a United States district judge for the United States District Court for the Eastern District of Louisiana. On January 17, 2019, his nomination was sent to the Senate. President Trump nominated Guidry to the seat vacated by Judge Kurt D. Engelhardt, who was elevated to the United States Court of Appeals for the Fifth Circuit on May 10, 2018. On February 13, 2019, a hearing on his nomination was held before the Senate Judiciary Committee. On March 7, 2019, his nomination was reported out of committee by a 12–10 vote. On June 18, 2019, the Senate invoked cloture on his nomination by a 53–43 vote. On June 19, 2019, he was confirmed by a 53–46 vote. He received his judicial commission on June 21, 2019.

See also 
 List of justices of the Louisiana Supreme Court

References

External links 
 
 Personal bio

1960 births
Living people
20th-century American lawyers
21st-century American lawyers
21st-century American judges
Assistant United States Attorneys
Circuit court judges in the United States
Federalist Society members
Judges of the United States District Court for the Eastern District of Louisiana
Louisiana Republicans
Louisiana state court judges
Louisiana State University Law Center alumni
Justices of the Louisiana Supreme Court
People from Jefferson Parish, Louisiana
People from Lafourche Parish, Louisiana
United States district court judges appointed by Donald Trump
University of the Witwatersrand alumni